Sérgio Antônio Almeida Pessoa (born 5 July 1962) is a Brazilian judoka. He competed in the men's extra-lightweight event at the 1988 Summer Olympics.

References

1962 births
Living people
Brazilian male judoka
Olympic judoka of Brazil
Judoka at the 1988 Summer Olympics
Sportspeople from São Paulo